Cavaion Veronese is a comune (municipality) in the Province of Verona in the Italian region Veneto, located about  west of Venice and about  northwest of Verona.

The municipality of Cavaion Veronese contains the frazione (subdivision) Sega.

Cavaion Veronese borders the following municipalities: Affi, Bardolino, Pastrengo, Rivoli Veronese, and Sant'Ambrogio di Valpolicella.

Demographic evolution

Twin city
Cavaion is twinned with
  - Bad Aibling, Bavaria, Germany, since 2006

References

External links
 www.comunecavaion.it/

Cities and towns in Veneto